Jagjivan Ram (5 April 1908 – 6 July 1986), known popularly as Babuji, was an Indian independence activist and politician from Bihar. He was instrumental in the foundation of the All India Depressed Classes League, an organisation dedicated to attaining equality for untouchables, in 1935 and was elected to Bihar Legislative Assembly in 1937, after which he organised the rural labour movement.

In 1946, he became the youngest minister in Jawaharlal Nehru's interim government, the first cabinet of India as a Labour Minister and also a member of the Constituent Assembly of India, where he ensured that social justice was enshrined in the Constitution. He went on to serve as a minister with various portfolios for the next 30 years as a member of the Indian National Congress (INC). Most importantly, he was the Defence Minister of India during the Indo-Pak war of 1971, which resulted in the creation of Bangladesh. His contribution to the Green Revolution in India and modernising Indian agriculture, during his two tenures as Union Agriculture Minister are still remembered, especially during the 1974 drought when he was asked to hold the additional portfolio to tide over the food crisis.

Though he supported Prime Minister Indira Gandhi during the Emergency (1975–77), he left Congress in 1977 and joined the Janata Party alliance, along with his Congress for Democracy. He later served as the Deputy Prime Minister of India (1977–79); then in 1981, he formed Congress (J). At his death, he was the last surviving minister of the Interim Government and the last surviving original member of the first cabinet of independent India. Including his service during the Interim Government, his total tenure of over 30 years in various ministries remains the longest of any Indian federal minister.

Early life and education
Jagjivan Ram was born at Chandwa near Arrah in Bihar into the Chamar caste of Indian Caste System. He had an elder brother, Sant Lal, and three sisters. His father Sobhi Ram was with the British Indian Army, posted at Peshawar, but later resigned due to some differences, and bought farming land in his native village Chandwa and settled there. He also became a Mahant of the Shiv Narayani sect, and being skilled in calligraphy, illustrated many books for the sect that were distributed locally.

Young Jagjivan attended a local school in January 1914. Upon the premature death of his father, Jagjivan and his mother Vasanti Devi were left in a harsh economic situation. He joined Aggrawal Middle School in Arrah in 1920, where the medium of instruction was English for the first time, and joined Arrah Town School in 1922. It was here that he faced caste discrimination for the first time, yet remained unfazed. An often cited incident occurred in this school; there was a tradition of having two water pots in the school, one for Hindus and another for Muslims. Jagjivan drank water from the Hindu pot, and because he was from an untouchable class, the matter was reported to the Principal, who placed a third pot for untouchables in the school. Jagjivan broke this pot twice in protest, until the Principal decided against placing the third pot. A turning point in his life came in 1925, when Pt. Madan Mohan Malviya visited his school, and impressed by his welcome address, invited him to join the Banaras Hindu University.

Jagjivan Ram passed his matriculation in the first division and joined the Banaras Hindu University (BHU) in 1927, where he was awarded the Birla scholarship, and passed his Inter Science Examination. While at BHU, he organised the scheduled castes to protest against social discrimination. As a Dalit student, he was denied basic services like meals in his hostel and haircuts by local barbers. A Dalit barber would arrive occasionally to trim his hair. Eventually, Jagjivan left BHU and continued his education at Calcutta University. In 2007, the BHU set up a Babu Jagjivan Ram Chair in its faculty of social sciences to study caste discrimination and economic backwardness.

He received a B. Sc. degree from the University of Calcutta in 1931, where again he organised conferences to draw attention toward issues of discrimination, and also participated in the anti-untouchability movement started by Mahatma Gandhi.

Early career
Netaji Subhash Chandra Bose took notice of him at Kolkata, when in 1928 he organised a Mazdoor Rally at Wellington Square, in which approximately 50,000 people participated. When the devastating 1934 Nepal–Bihar earthquake occurred he got actively involved in the relief work and his efforts were appreciated. When popular rule was introduced under the 1935 Act and the scheduled castes were given representation in the legislatures, both the nationalists and the British loyalists sought him because of his first-hand knowledge of the social and economic situation in Bihar. Jagjivan Ram was nominated to the Bihar Council. He chose to go with the nationalists and joined Congress, which wanted him not only because he was valued as an able spokesperson for the depressed classes, but also that he could counter B. R. Ambedkar; he was elected to the Bihar assembly in 1937. However, he resigned his membership on the issue of irrigation cess. He criticized Ambedkar as a "coward" who could not lead his people.

In 1935, he contributed to the establishment of the All-India Depressed Classes League, an organisation dedicated to attaining equality for untouchables. He was also drawn into the Indian National Congress. In the same year he proposed a resolution in the 1935 session of the Hindu Mahasabha demanding that temples and drinking water wells be opened up to Dalits; and in the early 1940s was imprisoned twice for his active participation in the Satyagraha and the Quit India Movements. He was among the principal leaders who publicly denounced India's participation in the World War II between the European nations and for which he was imprisoned in 1940.

Role in the Constitution 
In the Constituent Assembly he advocated for the rights of Dalits and argued for affirmative action based on caste in elected bodies and government services.

Parliamentary career
In 1946, he became the youngest minister in Jawaharlal Nehru's provisional government and also the subsequent First Indian Cabinet, as a Labour Minister, where he is credited for laying the foundation for several labour welfare policies in India.
He was a part of the prestigious high-profile Indian delegation that attended the International Labour Organization (ILO)'s International Labour Conference on 16 August 1947 in Geneva, along with the great Gandhian Bihar Bibhuti Dr. Anugrah Narayan Sinha, his chief political mentor and also the then head of the delegation, and a few days later he was elected President of the ILO.  He served as Labour minister until 1952. He was member of the Constituent assembly that drafted India's constitution. Ram also served in the interim national government of 1946. Later, he held several ministerial posts in Nehru's Cabinet – Communications (1952–56), Transport and Railways (1956–62), and Transport and Communications (1962–63).

In Indira Gandhi's government, he worked as minister for Labour, Employment, and Rehabilitation (1966–67), and Union Minister for Food and Agriculture (1967–70), where he is best remembered for having successfully led the Green Revolution during his tenure. When the Congress Party split in 1969, Jagjivan Ram joined the camp led by Indira Gandhi, and became the president of that faction of Congress. He worked as the Minister of Defence (1970–74) making him the virtual No. 2 in the cabinet, Minister for Agriculture and Irrigation (1974–77). It was during his tenure as the minister of Defence that the Indo-Pakistani War of 1971 was fought, and Bangladesh gained independence. While loyal to prime minister Indira Gandhi for most of the Indian Emergency, in 1977 he along with five other politicians resigned from the Cabinet and formed the Congress for Democracy party, within the Janata coalition.

A few days before the elections, on a Sunday, Jagjivan Ram addressed an Opposition rally at the famous Ram Lila Grounds in Delhi. The national broadcaster Doordarshan allegedly attempted to stop crowds from participating in the demonstration by telecasting the blockbuster movie Bobby. The rally still drew large crowds, and a newspaper headline the next day ran "Babu beats Bobby."  He was the Deputy Prime Minister of India when Morarji Desai was the prime minister, from 1977 to 1979. Though initially reluctant to join the cabinet, he was not present at the oath-taking ceremony on 24 March 1977, but he eventually did so at the behest of Jai Prakash Narayan, who insisted that his presence was necessary, "not just as an individual but as a political and social force." However, he was once again given the defence portfolio. His last position in government was as Deputy Prime Minister of India in the Janata Party government of  1977–1979,

When the split in Janata Party forced early General Election in 1980, Janata Party contested it with Jagjivan Ram as its Prime Ministerial candidate, but the party won only 31 seats out of 542. Disillusioned with the Janata party he joined Congress (Urs) faction. In 1981, he separated from that faction as well, and formed his own party, the Congress (J).

He remained a member of Parliament right from the first election in 1952 till his death in 1986, after over forty years as a parliamentarian. He was elected from Sasaram parliament constituency in Bihar. His uninterrupted representation in the Parliament from 1936 to 1986 is a world record.

Positions held

Politics and government

 Member of the Central Legislature for over 30 years consecutively.
 He holds the record for being the longest-serving cabinet minister in India.
 Union Minister of Labour, 1946–1952.
 Union Minister for Communications, 1952–1956.
 Union Minister for Transport and Railways, 1956–1962.
 Union Minister for Transport and Communications, 1962–1963.
 Union Minister for Labour, Employment and Rehabilitation, 1966–1967.
 Union Minister for Food and Agriculture, 1967–1970.
 Union Minister of Defence, 1970–1974, 1977–1979.
 Union Minister of Agriculture and Irrigation, 1974–1977.
 President of Indian National Congress
 Founding Member, Congress for Democracy party (aligned with Janata Party), 1977.
 Deputy Prime Minister of India, 24 January 1979 – 28 July 1979.
 Founder, Congress (J).

Other positions held with Thanmai
 He served as President of the Bharat Scouts and Guides from September 1976 to April 1983.

Personal life
In August 1933, his first wife died after a brief illness. In June 1935, he married Indrani Devi, a daughter of Dr. Birbal, a well-known social worker of Kanpur. The couple had two children, Suresh Kumar who was infamously reported in Menaka Gandhi's Surya newspaper, having extra-marital relationship with a 21-year-old woman  and Meira Kumar, a five-time Member of Parliament, who won from his former seat Sasaram in both 2004 and 2009, and became the first woman Speaker of Lok Sabha in 2009.

Thanmai
The place of his cremation has been turned into a memorial, Thanmai, and his birth anniversary is observed as Thanmai, (Equality Day) in India. His birth centenary celebrations were held all over the nation in 2008. Demands for awarding him a posthumous Bharat Ratna have been raised from time to time in Hyderabad. Andhra University conferred an honorary doctorate on him in 1973, and in 2009 on the occasion of his 101st birth anniversary, his statue was unveiled on the university premises.

To propagate his ideologies, the 'Babu Jagjivan Ram National Foundation' has been set up by Ministry of Social Justice, Govt. of India in Delhi.

The training academy for Railway Protection Force officers is named after Jagjivan Ram.

The first indigenously built electric locomotive, a WAM-1 model, was named after him and was recently restored by the Eastern Railway.

In 2015, the Babu Jagjeevan Ram English Medium Secondary School was established in Mahatma Gandhi Nagar, Yerawada, Pune. As of March 2016, the school serves 125 7th and 8th graders from Yerawada. The school honours Babuji and his advocacy of education and opportunity for all people of lower castes by being the first Pune Municipal Corporation public school to offer education past the 7th grade.

He also has a hospital named in his honour – Jagjivan Ram Hospital – in the Mumbai Central Area of Mumbai.

References

Further reading and bibliography

External links

 Babu Jagjivan Ram, Tribute website
 Babu Jagjivan Ram, Info website
 Babu Jagjivan Ram, a Centenary Celebrations Special
 http://cadindia.clpr.org.in/constituent_assembly_members/jagjivan_ram

|-

|-

|-

1908 births
1986 deaths
India MPs 1952–1957
India MPs 1957–1962
India MPs 1962–1967
India MPs 1967–1970
India MPs 1971–1977
India MPs 1977–1979
India MPs 1980–1984
India MPs 1984–1989
Banaras Hindu University alumni
Defence Ministers of India
First Nehru ministry
Indian Deputy Prime Ministers
Indian independence activists from Bihar
Members of the Constituent Assembly of India
People from Sasaram
Janata Party politicians
Presidents of the Indian National Congress
Railway Ministers of India
Labour ministers of India
Scouting and Guiding in India
University of Calcutta alumni
English-language writers from India
Indian Hindus
Lok Sabha members from Bihar
Pro tem Speakers of the Lok Sabha
Dalit politicians
Agriculture Ministers of India
Congress for Democracy politicians
Indian National Congress (U) politicians
Members of the Council of the Governor General of India